The Charles Crook House is a house located in north Portland, Oregon, that is listed on the National Register of Historic Places.

See also
 National Register of Historic Places listings in North Portland, Oregon

References

1894 establishments in Oregon
Houses completed in 1894
Houses on the National Register of Historic Places in Portland, Oregon
Queen Anne architecture in Oregon
North Portland, Oregon
Piedmont, Portland, Oregon
Portland Historic Landmarks